Jiří Prudil (born 28 June 1957) is a Czech rower. He competed in the men's coxless four event at the 1980 Summer Olympics.

References

1957 births
Living people
Czech male rowers
Olympic rowers of Czechoslovakia
Rowers at the 1980 Summer Olympics
Sportspeople from Brno